Barbara Ingiro-Sapea (born 6 December 1962) is a Papua New Guinean former sprinter. She competed in the women's 100 metres at the 1984 Summer Olympics.

References

External links
 

1962 births
Living people
Athletes (track and field) at the 1984 Summer Olympics
Papua New Guinean female sprinters
Papua New Guinean female hurdlers
Olympic athletes of Papua New Guinea
Place of birth missing (living people)